Pervitino is an estate located in Pervitino village in 15 kilometres from Likhoslavl, Tver Oblast, Russia, on the left bank of the Kava river. Known since the 18th century as the ancestral estate of the nobility Shishkov, Khvostov, and Rimsky-Korsakov.

History 

The ensemble of the Pervitino estate includes the main building of the first half of the 19th century, the Trinity Church with a bell tower built in 1794, architectural elements of the church fence and the remains of a park. All elements as the ensemble of the estate Pervitino as a whole are protected by the Russian state as objects of the historical and cultural heritage of the peoples of the Russian Federation of federal significance.  The ensemble of the Pervitino estate, including the main building of the manor and the Trinity Cathedral, is currently need of repair and reconstruction.

In the local Pervitino local history museum (village Pervitino, Sevastyanova street, 14) a rich material on the history of the estate was collected.

See also 

 Pervitino, Likhoslavlsky District, Tver Oblast
 Trinity Church, Pervitino
 Pervitino local history museum

References

Sources 

 Тверская область. Энциклопедический справочник. Тверь, 1994.
 Тверской край в XX веке: Документы и материалы. Вып. 2: 1907 г. – февраль 1917 г. Тверь, 1995.
 Тверская деревня. Т.1. Лихославльский район. Энциклопедия. Тверь, 2001. C.418-419.
 Из рода Хвостовых: Жизнь одной семьи из рода Хвостовых. Сост. Г. Г. Иванова. Калининград-Лихославль, 2003.
 В забытых усадьбах. Очерки по истории тверской дворянской корпорации. Тверь, 2014.

Gallery

External links 

 Khvostov’s estate in Pervitino (Rus)
 Постановлением Совета Министров РСФСР № 624 от 04.12.1974 «О дополнении и частичном изменении постановления Совета Министров РСФСР от 30 августа 1960 года № 1327 «О дальнейшем улучшении дела охраны памятников культуры в РСФСР»
 Pervitino estate. Monument of town planning and architecture of federal significance (Rus)
 Pervitino village (Rus)
 Pervitino Estate (VIDEO)
 18th Century Trinity Church in Pervitino Village, Tver Region (VIDEO)

Houses in Russia
Buildings and structures in Tver Oblast
Churches in Tver Oblast
Museums in Tver Oblast
Monuments in Tver Oblast
Cultural heritage monuments of federal significance in Tver Oblast